Hugh Porter may refer to:

Hugh Porter (b. 1940), English cyclist and BBC commentator
Hugh Porter (cricketer) (1911–1982), English cricketer
Hugh Porter (poet) (1780–1839), Ulster Scots poet
Hugh Porter (Wisconsin politician) (1843–1936), American politician in Wisconsin